Private Robert Fulton Dodd (December 31, 1844 to September 14, 1903) was a Canadian soldier who fought in the American Civil War. Dodd received the United States' highest award for bravery during combat, the Medal of Honor, for his action during the Battle of the Crater in Petersburg, Virginia on 30 July 1864. He was honored with the award on 27 July 1896.

Biography
Dodd was born in Galt in Ontario, Canada on 31 December 1844. He enlisted into an independent company within the Michigan infantry called the Stanton Guards on 4 May 1862. After mustering out of this company on 25 September 1862, he reenlisted into the 27th Volunteer Infantry on 25 February 1863. It was while serving in this capacity that he performed the act of gallantry on 30 July 1864, during the Battle of the Crater, that would earn him the medal of honor. He mustered out of the army on 26 July 1865 and eventually returned to Canada.

He died on 14 September 1903 and his remains are interred at the Hillside Cemetery in Manitoba.

Medal of Honor citation

See also

List of American Civil War Medal of Honor recipients: A–F

References

1844 births
1903 deaths
Pre-Confederation Canadian emigrants to the United States
Canadian-born Medal of Honor recipients
People from Cambridge, Ontario
People of Michigan in the American Civil War
Union Army officers
United States Army Medal of Honor recipients
American Civil War recipients of the Medal of Honor